Alexander Crockett may refer to:

Alex Crockett (born 1981), English former rugby player
Alexander G. Crockett (1862–1919), American politician